The following lists events from 1991 in Egypt.

Incumbents
 President – Hosni Mubarak
 Prime Minister – Atef Sedky

Events
 20 September–1 October – The All-Africa Games are held in Cairo.

Births
 16 January – Mohammad Sanad, handball player

Deaths
 3 August – Ali Sabri, politician (b. 1920)

References

 
Years of the 20th century in Egypt
Egypt
Egypt
1990s in Egypt
Egypt